"Are You Magnetic?" is the second single from Faker's second studio album Be the Twilight, although not achieving the major success as "This Heart Attack", it was very favored on channels and TV shows such as Channel V Hit Rater, MTV My Pix, and Network Ten Video Hits.

Track listing
 "Are You Magnetic?" (Radio edit)
 "Sleepwalking" (Hong Kong Blonds Remix)
 "Are You Magnetic?" (Paul Mac Remix)

2007 songs
Faker (band) songs